Jose Ramirez Rapadas III (born July 12, 1972) is a Filipino prelate of the Roman Catholic Church. He is currently the Bishop of the Diocese of Iligan in the Philippines.

Background
Rapadas was born on July 12, 1972 in Tondo, Manila, but he was raised in Ipil, Zamboanga Sibugay. He attended St. John Vianney Theological Seminary in Cagayan de Oro, and was ordained a priest in 1999. He also attended the Loyola School of Theology at the Ateneo de Manila University where he obtained his licentiate in dogmatic theology.

Ministry

Sacerdotal
He served as a seminary professor and rector at Saint Joseph College Seminary, and as professor of religious studies University of Zamboanga. Prior to his appointment as bishop of Iligan, he served as vicar general of the diocese of Ipil in Zamboanga Sibugay.

Episcopal
Pope Francis appointed Rapadas to be the 5th Bishop of Iligan on June 13, 2019, nearly two years after the passing of then-Bishop Elenito Galido in 2017. He took over from Bishop Severo Caermare of the diocese of Dipolog whom Pope Francis had assigned to administer the parish during its sede vacante period.

References

21st-century Roman Catholic bishops in the Philippines
Living people
1972 births
People from Lanao del Norte